Estero Real Natural Reserve is a nature reserve in Nicaragua. It is one of the 78 reserves that are under official protection in the country.  It is in the Northwest corner of Nicaragua in Chinandega Department and borders the country of Honduras.

See also
Llanos de Apacunca Genetic Reserve
Tourism in Nicaragua

References

Protected areas of Nicaragua
Ramsar sites in Nicaragua
Chinandega Department